Jannābī or Al-Jannābī (meaning from Genaveh) may refer to the following:
Abu Sa'id al-Jannabi, founder of the Qarmati state in Bahrain and Ahsa
Abū-Tāhir Jannābī, son of Abū-Saʿīd Jannābī
Jannabi (band), a South Korean indie rock band